Michael P. Spradlin is the New York Times Bestselling and Edgar Award-nominated author of the Spy Goddess series, The Youngest Templar series, as well as several works of historical fiction, including the Western Heritage Award winning Off like the Wind: The Story of the Pony Express. He currently resides in Lapeer, Michigan with his wife, daughter, and two schnoodles Apollo and Willow. Spradlin grew up in Homer, Michigan and graduated from Homer Community High School in 1978 and attended Central Michigan University where he graduated with a BS degree in History in 1982.

Novels 
Spy Goddess 
 Spy Goddess: Live and Let Shop
 Spy Goddess: To Hawaii, With Love
 Spy Goddess: The Spy Who Totally Had A Crush on Me
 Spy Goddess Manga, Vol I: The Chase for the Chalice
 Spy Goddess Manga, Vol II: The Quest for the LanceThe Youngest Templar The Youngest Templar: Keeper of the Grail
 The Youngest Templar: Trail of Fate 
 The Youngest Templar: Orphan of DestinyKiller Species series Killer Species #1: Menace from the Deep
 Killer Species #2: Feeding Frenzy
 Killer Species #3: Out for Blood
 Killer Species #4: Ultimate AttackWorld War II Into the Killing Seas
 The Enemy Above
 Prisoner of WarOther Works Blood Riders

 Nonfiction books Medal of Honor'Jack Montgomery: World War II: Gallantry at AnzioRyan Pitts: Afghanistan: A Firefight in the Mountains of WanatLeo Thorsniss: Vietnam: Valor in the SkyJohn Basilone: World War II: Bravery at Guadalcanal Illustrated books 

 The Legend of Blue Jacket Daniel Boone's Great Escape Off like the Wind: The Story of the Pony Express Texas Rangers: Legendary Lawmen Monster AlphabetHumor books
 It's Beginning To Look A Lot Like Zombies: A Book Of Zombie Christmas Carols Every Zombie Eats Somebody Sometime: A Book Of Zombie Love Songs Jack and Jill Went Up To Kill: A Book Of Zombie Nursery Rhymes Pirate Haiku: Bilge Sucking Poems of Booty Grog and Wenches For Scurvy Sea Dogs''

References

External links 
 Michael Spradlin Official Website
 The Youngest Templar Official Website

American children's writers
Living people
Year of birth missing (living people)
American male novelists